Katavi is a village in India, situated in Mawal taluka of Pune district in the state of Maharashtra.

Administration
The village is administrated by a sarpanch, an elected representative who leads a gram panchayat. At the time of the 2011 Census of India, the gram panchayat governed just Katavi and was based at Vadgaon.

Demographics
At the 2011 census, the village comprised 94 households. The population of 546 was split between 281 males and 265 females.

Air travel connectivity 
The closest airport to the village is Pune Airport.

See also
List of villages in Mawal taluka

References

Villages in Mawal taluka